Pseudopityophthorus is a genus of typical bark beetles in the family Curculionidae. There are about 11 described species in Pseudopityophthorus.

Species
 Pseudopityophthorus agrifoliae Blackman, 1931
 Pseudopityophthorus asperulus (LeConte, 1868)
 Pseudopityophthorus denticulus Wood, 1977
 Pseudopityophthorus fagi Blackman, 1931
 Pseudopityophthorus granulatus Blackman, 1931
 Pseudopityophthorus minutissimus (Zimmermann, 1868) (oak bark beetle)
 Pseudopityophthorus opacicollis Blackman, 1931
 Pseudopityophthorus pruinosus (Eichhoff, 1878)
 Pseudopityophthorus pubescens Blackman, 1931
 Pseudopityophthorus pubipennis (LeConte, 1860) (western oak bark beetle)
 Pseudopityophthorus yavapaii Blackman, 1931

References

 Poole, Robert W., and Patricia Gentili, eds. (1996). "Coleoptera". Nomina Insecta Nearctica: A Check List of the Insects of North America, vol. 1: Coleoptera, Strepsiptera, 41-820.

Further reading

 Arnett, R. H. Jr., M. C. Thomas, P. E. Skelley and J. H. Frank. (eds.). (21 June 2002). American Beetles, Volume II: Polyphaga: Scarabaeoidea through Curculionoidea. CRC Press LLC, Boca Raton, Florida .
 
 Richard E. White. (1983). Peterson Field Guides: Beetles. Houghton Mifflin Company.

External links

 NCBI Taxonomy Browser, Pseudopityophthorus

Scolytinae